Paraburkholderia dilworthii is a Gram-negative, rod-shaped bacterium from the genus Paraburkholderia and the family Burkholderiaceae.  It was isolated from the root nodules of the plant Lebeckia ambigua.

References

dilworthii
Bacteria described in 2014